Yāndǔxiān (腌笃鲜) is a Jiangnan cuisine made from a duo of cured pork and fresh pork with fresh winter bamboo shoots.

Origin
Many Chinese dishes have names adopted from folklore. "Yān" means salted pork, and "dǔ" represents the sound of the boiling soup, and "xiān" describe the delicate flavor of the soup. Yāndǔxiān is one of the typical local cuisine.

Recipe

Common ingredients are pork ham shank, bone-in ham, fresh winter bamboo shoot, fresh ginger root, ground white pepper, pork stock, water, and scallions.

See also
 Cuisine of China

References 

Shanghai cuisine
Chinese soups